The hairy-backed bulbul (Tricholestes criniger) is a songbird species in the bulbul family, Pycnonotidae. It is the sole species contained within the monotypic genus Tricholestes. It is found on the Malay Peninsula, Sumatra, and Borneo. Its natural habitat is subtropical or tropical moist lowland forests.

Taxonomy and systematics
The hairy-backed bulbul was originally described in the genus Brachypodius (a synonym for Pycnonotus). Alternatively, some authorities have classified the hairy-backed bulbul in the genera Trichophorus (a synonym for Criniger) and Hypsipetes.

Subspecies
Three subspecies are currently recognized:

 T. c. criniger - (Blyth, 1845): Found on the Malay Peninsula and eastern Sumatra
 T. c. sericeus - (Blyth, 1865): Originally described as a separate species in the genus Criniger. Found on western Sumatra
 T. c. viridis - (Bonaparte, 1854): Originally described as a separate species in the genus Trichophoropsis (a synonym for Setornis). Found on Borneo

References

hairy-backed bulbul
hairy-backed bulbul
Birds of Malesia
hairy-backed bulbul
hairy-backed bulbul
Taxonomy articles created by Polbot